The Order of Vanuatu has four grades.

 "Badge of Honour". 
 "Badge of Distinction". 
 The "Vanuatu Distinguished Service Medal". 
 The "Vanuatu Meritorious Service Medal".

Every grade in this order has another ribbon, each in the colours red-green-yellow and black.

The New Hebrides, a French-British condominium became independent in 1980. In 1988 the government of Vanuatu founded a single order of merit.

External links
 Ribbons on 

Orders, decorations, and medals of Vanuatu
Awards established in 1988
1988 establishments in Oceania